Iglesia ni Cristo (abbreviated as INC;) is an independent Nontrinitarian Christian church, founded in 1913 and registered by Felix Y. Manalo in 1914 as a unipersonal religious corporation to the Insular Government of the Philippines.

INC describes itself to be the one true church and the restoration of the original church founded by Jesus, whereby all other Christian churches are apostate. According to INC doctrine, the official registration of the church with the Philippine government was on July 27, 1914, by Felix Y. Manalo—who is upheld by members to be the last messenger of God—was an act of divine providence and the fulfillment of biblical prophecy concerning the re-establishment of the original church of Christ in the Far East concurrent with the coming of the seventh seal marking the end of days.

By the time of Manalo's death in 1963, INC had become a nationwide church with 1,250 local chapels and 35 cathedrals. As his successor, Manalo's son, Eraño G. Manalo, led a campaign to grow and internationalize the church until his death on August 31, 2009. His son, Eduardo V. Manalo, succeeded him as Executive Minister. The 2015 Philippine census reported that 2,664,498 of the population's religious affiliation was with the church, placing it fourth behind, Catholic Church, 80,304,061, Other Local Ethnicity, 24,042,850, and Islam, 6,064,744.

History
During American Occupation over the Philippines, there were a variety of rural anti-colonial movements, often with religious undertones, and American Protestant missionaries introduced several alternatives to the Catholic Church, the established church during the Spanish colonial period.

Felix Y. Manalo

Felix Y. Manalo, born on May 10, 1886, in Taguig, Philippines, was baptized in the Catholic Church. In his teenage years, Manalo became dissatisfied with Catholic theology. According to the National Historical Commission of the Philippines, the establishment of the Philippine Independent Church (also called the Aglipayan Church) was his major turning point, but Manalo remained uninterested since its doctrines were mainly Catholic. In 1904, he joined the Methodist Episcopal Church, entered the Methodist seminary, and became a pastor for a while. He also sought through various denominations, including the Presbyterian Church, Christian Mission, and finally Seventh-day Adventist Church in 1911. Manalo left Adventism in 1913 and associated himself with atheist and agnostic peers.

In November 1913, Manalo secluded himself with religious literature and unused notebooks in a friend's house in Pasay, instructing everyone in the house not to disturb him. He emerged from seclusion three days later with his new-found doctrines. Manalo, together with his wife, went to Punta, Santa Ana, Manila, in November 1913 and started preaching. He left the congregation in the care of his first ordained minister and returned to his native Taguig to evangelise; there, he was ridiculed and stoned at his meetings with locals. He was later able to baptize a few converts, including some of his persecutors. He later registered his new-found religion as the Iglesia ni Cristo (English: Church of Christ; Spanish: Iglesia de Cristo) on July 27, 1914, at the Bureau of Commerce as a corporation sole, with himself as the first executive minister. Expansion followed as INC started building congregations in the provinces in 1916, with Pasig (then in Rizal province) having two locals established. The first three ministers were ordained in 1919.

By 1924, INC had about 3,000 to 5,000 adherents in 43 or 45 congregations in Manila and six nearby provinces. By 1936, INC had 85,000 members. This figure grew to 200,000 by 1954. A Cebu congregation was built in 1937—the first to be established outside of Luzon, and the first in the Visayas. The first mission to Mindanao was commissioned in 1946. Meanwhile, its first concrete chapel was built in Sampaloc, Manila, in 1948. Adherents fleeing for the provinces away from Manila, where the Japanese forces were concentrated during World War II, were used for evangelization. As Manalo's health began to fail in the 1950s, his son Eraño began taking leadership of the church. Manalo died on April 12, 1963.

Reaching the Far West and expansion

On July 27, 1968, Eraño G. Manalo officiated the inaugural worship service of the church in Ewa Beach, Honolulu, Hawaii—the first mission of the church outside the Philippines. The following month, INC established the San Francisco congregation. INC reached Europe through the United Kingdom in 1971, and Canada in 1973. INC established its first congregation in South Africa in 1978. INC established congregations in Rome, Italy on July 27, 1994; Jerusalem, Israel on March 31, 1996; and Athens, Greece on May 10, 1997. In 1998, INC has established 543 congregations, and missions in 74 countries outside the Philippines.

In 1965, INC launched its first resettlement and land reform program in Barrio Maligaya, Laur, Nueva Ecija. INC started operating a radio station in 1969 while its first television program aired in 1983. The Ministerial Institute of Development, renamed as "Iglesia ni Cristo (Church Of Christ) School for Ministers", was founded in 1974 in Quiapo, Manila, and moved in Quezon City in 1978. In 1971, the INC Central Office building was built in Quezon City. In 1984, the 7,000-seat Central Temple was added in the complex. The Tabernacle, a multipurpose tent-like building which can accommodate up to 4,000 people, was finished in 1989. The complex also includes the New Era University, a tertiary education institution run by INC. Eraño G. Manalo died on August 31, 2009. His son, Eduardo V. Manalo, succeeded him as executive minister upon his death.

21st century

On July 21, 2014, former President Benigno Aquino III and INC executive minister Eduardo V. Manalo led the inauguration of Ciudad de Victoria, a 140-hectare tourism zone in Bocaue and Santa Maria, Bulacan, where the Philippine Arena is also located. The Philippine Arena, a 55,000-seat multi-purpose structure owned by the INC, currently holds the Guinness World Record for the largest mixed-used indoor theater.

Philippine government declared the year 2014 as the "Iglesia ni Cristo Centennial Year" through Proclamation No. 815, whereas, July 27 of the same year was declared as a special non-working holiday to commemorate the 100th founding anniversary of Iglesia ni Cristo.

On July 27, 2014, INC celebrated its centennial anniversary at Ciudad de Victoria, with Philippine Arena as the main venue, and in about 1,180 worship buildings worldwide through live video feed. The week-long celebration consisted of pyro-musical displays, worship service led by Manalo, oratorio, musical presentation, theatrical play, quiz show, and evangelical mission. For the worship service conducted for the INC centennial, INC secured two Guinness World Records for the largest gospel choir with 4,745 members and largest mixed-used indoor theater for the Philippine Arena  with 51,929 attendees.  On July 26, 2015, INC capped their centennial year through different activities such as International Unity Games, worship service led by Manalo, and Closing Centennial Celebration which were held at Washington D.C. United States, and the Philippine Arena.

On October 4, 2015, INC, through Viva films, conducted the world premiere of Felix Manalo, a film depicting the origin of the INC and the life of its first executive minister, which was held at the Philippine Arena.

According to the resolution passed by the Senate of the Philippines to commemorate INC's 104th anniversary, INC has already established more than 7,000 congregations in 151 countries and territories throughout the world.

Beliefs and core values
Iglesia ni Cristo believes that it is the true church established by Jesus Christ in the first century, and that its registration in the Philippines is the fulfillment of biblical prophecies that Christ's church would re-emerge in the Far East. Because of a number of similarities, INC's doctrines have been described as restorationist in outlook and theme.

Bible
The Iglesia ni Cristo believes that the Bible is the only book inspired by God, thus it is the sole basis of all their beliefs and practices.

God the Father, Jesus Christ and the Holy Spirit
The Iglesia ni Cristo believes that God the Father is the creator deity and the only true God. INC rejects the traditional Christian belief in the Trinity as heresy, adopting a version of unitarianism. They believe that this position is attested by Jesus Christ and the Apostles.

The church believes that Jesus Christ is the Son of God and the mediator between God the Father and humanity, and was created by God the Father. God sanctified him to be without sin, and bestowed upon him the titles "Lord" and "Son of God". The church sees Jesus as God's highest creation, believe that he is a Man and denies the deity of Jesus. Adherents profess Jesus' substitutionary role in the redemption of humankind. He is believed to have been "foreordained before the foundation of the world" and sent by God "to deal with sin". Members "are saved by Christ's blood" who died because of his "self-sacrificing love".

INC believes that the Holy Spirit is the power of God and also not a deity, being sent by God the Father and Jesus Christ to guide God's people.

One true church

The Iglesia ni Cristo believes that it is the one true church founded by Jesus Christ and was restored by Felix Manalo in the last days. They believe that the first century church apostasized in that century, or in the 4th century due to false teachings. INC says that this apostate church is the Catholic Church. Meanwhile, its reestablishment is seen as the signal for the end of days.

They believe that the Iglesia ni Cristo is the fulfillment of the Bible verse, Isaiah 43:5, where "east" refers to the Philippines where the Church of Christ would be founded. INC teaches that its members constitute the "elect of God" and there is no salvation outside the Iglesia ni Cristo. Faith alone is insufficient for salvation. The Iglesia ni Cristo says that the official name of the true church is "Church of Christ or Iglesia ni Cristo (in Tagalog)". The two passages often cited by INC to support this are Romans 16:16 "Greet one another with a holy kiss. The churches of Christ greet you",
and the George Lamsa translation of Acts 20:28: "Take heed therefore ... to feed the church of Christ which he has purchased with his blood."

Felix Manalo as the founder
According to INC, Manalo is the "angel from the east" mentioned in Revelation 7:1–3 who started preaching about the INC coincide the outbreak of the World War I. This is the start of the period according to INC being referred to in the Bible as the ends of the earth
(cf Is 41:9-10; 43:5-6) the time when the end of the world is near, even at the very doors (cf. Mt. 24:3, 33), which began with the outbreak of a war of global proportions (cf. Mt. 24:6-7) Manalo is from the Philippines, which they say is in the "center" of the Far East. The ‘four winds’ in Revelation 7:1-3, they say refers to World War I and the four angels are the four leaders known as the big four (Woodrow Wilson, David Lloyd George, Georges Clemenceau, and Vittorio Orlando) who they say worked on the prevention of the war to continue.

Manalo is also portrayed as the fulfillment of several passages in Isaiah and other books of the Bible.

As the one who sent by God to restore INC, Manalo became the first executive minister and spiritual leader of the church. As such, he taught that what is written in the Bible was the ultimate authority in all aspects of the church, and effectively as a messenger of God, Manalo is "the foremost Biblical authority for all humanity and the divinely designated leader of a reestablished Church of Christ in the modern world."

Baptism
The church believes that baptism is done by immersion baptism or Believer's baptism by adults in water, and that it is necessary that people be baptised in the Iglesia ni Cristo to become disciples of Jesus Christ. The church rejects infant baptism. Newborn children of members are instead dedicated to God through a congregational prayer, led by an ordained minister of the INC.

Expulsion
Members who are not living in accordance with the doctrines taught in the INC are admonished. Those who continue in violation of INC doctrines after being admonished are expelled  from the INC, thus losing salvation. As such, the church does not believe in the perseverance of the saints. Certain violations, such as eating blood, having too long of an absence from church services without a solid reason, drinking alcohol, or having a romantic relationship (including marriage) with a non-member, may result in mandatory expulsion.

Eschatology and resurrection 

INC believes that a person is composed of a body ("vehicle"), soul ("individual") and spirit ("life" or fuel). Members believe that when a person dies, their body and soul both die and go into the grave where both will remain until the Second Coming of Christ, whereas the spirit will go back to God. Upon Christ's return, all dead servants of God, from the time of the patriarchs up to the last days, would be resurrected to join living faithful and loyal INC members. They will be rewarded by living in the Holy City or New Jerusalem, together with God the Father, and Jesus Christ. At the right time chosen by God, a second resurrection would occur, and non-INC members will experience second death which is the Lake of Fire (Dagát-dagatang Apóy).

The church believes that God set a day where he will judge all people. They believe that this day is also the Second Coming of Jesus Christ.

Practices

Worship and prayer

The church conducts regular worship services, one during the week, and one during the weekend, conducted in the local languages (providing sign language interpreters and translators in some congregations). It consists of singing of hymns, prayers, studies of the bible, collection of voluntary offerings, and benediction. Both God the Father and Jesus are worshiped. The ministers of every congregation in a given worship service use the same sermon outline prepared by the executive minister. Deacons and Deaconesses guide worshipers to their seats and collect voluntary offerings. The singing of hymns is led by the locale's choir. The first hymnbook, termed Ang Himnario ng Iglesia ni Cristo, which consists of over 300 songs, was published in 1937. Children's worship services (Tagalog: Pagsamba ng Kabataan, or PNK) are held every weekend. They use similar lessons as the standard worship services taught using the Socratic method (question and answer). The church teaches that willfully forsaking the worship service is a grievous sin, thus members are expected to attend the congregational worship services twice a week without fail.

The church encourages its members to make prayer a part of everyday life. Thus, prayer before various activities, such as taking meals and going to sleep, are commonly practiced. Prayers recited in rote repetition are not observed.

Evangelism
Since February 1939, the church has been publishing Pasugo ('God's Message') in both Tagalog and English. Filipino has been the only language used since its inception in 1939 until 1953. Currently, about two-thirds of its pages are devoted to the English-speaking population. Felix Manalo wrote its first editorial where he stated the publication's purpose, including the propagation of the faith. Issues contain articles which detail INC doctrines and refute doctrines which it considers as heresy, such as the Trinity. It also features information on church history, educational programs and missionary achievements, including lists and photographs of newly dedicated chapels. In 2001, it had a monthly circulation of 235,000 copies. For the year 2009, there were more than four million copies of Pasugo distributed worldwide.

In the Philippines, through the Christian Era Broadcasting Service International Incorporated (CEBSI Incorporated), INC broadcasts programs that discuss Bible
teachings over the radio and television. These programs are aired by about 60 other radio stations all over the Philippines (i.e. INC Radio- DZEM 954kHz) and several more in the US and Australia. INCTV-48, as well as major cable stations in the Philippines and some channels in the US Direct TV ch 2068, telecast the INC's religious programs. These programs can also be seen in the Internet via one of the organisation's news website.

INC holds religious gatherings called evangelical missions regularly which aim to attract more followers. On February 28, 2012, INC held its largest Philippine-wide evangelical missions simultaneously on 19 sites across the country. In Manila site alone, more than 600,000 people attended the event. On April 13, 2013, INC launched Lingap-Pamamahayag under its project Kabayan Ko, Kapatid Ko (English: My Countrymen, My Brethren), which incorporates outreach missions to its evangelical missions. On September 26, 2015, INC held its first worldwide evangelical mission at the Philippine Arena as the main venue and in 2,125 sites throughout the world through video conferencing. It was officiated by INC executive minister, Eduardo Manalo.

Outreach

On November 19, 1981, INC has launched the Lingap sa Mamamayan ('Aid To Humanity') Program. The program aims to provide relief goods, health care, and other services to the needy, especially those who are afflicted by calamities and disasters. It also provides seminars for disaster preparedness, first aid, and family planning. Other humanitarian activities such as blood donation and community clean up drives were also conducted in different parts of the world where the Iglesia ni Cristo is established.

Felix Y. Manalo (FYM) Foundation, the INC's arm in executing the Lingap sa Mamamayan and other related programs, was formally registered in the Philippines on February 4, 2011, and in the United States on May 17, 2012. The institution is also recognized in Japan, South Korea, Spain, and Russia.

INC also established the Unlad International, Inc in 2012.

On July 7, 2012, the INC Lingap sa Mamamayan was conducted in the slums of Parola in Tondo, Manila and was awarded three Guinness world records for breaking records in the most people involved in a dental health check; the most blood pressure readings taken in 8 hours; and the most blood glucose level tests in 8 hours. On April 29, 2016, four more Guinness world records were broken by the INC. These records are the largest collection of clothes for recycle/donation, the most shoes donated to charity in 24 hours, the most medical ultrasound examinations in eight hours, and the most medical risk assessment in eight hours which was also held in Tondo, Manila.

On February 15, 2014, INC bagged another two Guinness world records when they conducted a worldwide charity walk simultaneously on 135 different sites scattered in 29 countries. INC holds the records for the largest charity walk on a single venue when 175,509 members of the church finished the 1.6 km walk in Manila; and for the largest charity walk in 24 hours (multiple venues) when a total of 519,521 participants finished the charity walk in different parts of the world. The proceeds were used for the housing and livelihood projects of super Typhoon Haiyan survivors. INC also broke the same records on May 6, 2018, for its Worldwide Walk to Fight Poverty with 283,171 people in single venue, and 773,136 people in multiple venues for its African missions and outreach.

On February 22, 2014, INC conducted another Lingap sa Mamamayan at its first resettlement project in Barrio Maligaya in Palayan City, Nueva Ecija. Coinciding with the barrio's 49th anniversary, INC bagged another world record after setting the record for the most hunger relief packs distributed within eight hours. A total of 302,311 hunger relief packages were given.

On March 14, 2014, after conducting a worship service in Tacloban, Leyte, INC executive minister Eduardo V. Manalo, led the groundbreaking ceremony of the EVM Self-Sustainable Community Rehabilitation Project in Sitio New Era, a 3000-hectare property of the church in Brgy. Langit, Alang-alang, Leyte. The project which costs more than one billion pesos includes at least 1000 housing units for the survivors of super typhoon Haiyan. Garments and dried fish factories, and eco-farming project are also included to provide livelihood to the community. More than 150,000 hunger relief packages were also given which contains 3 kilos of rice, canned goods and instant noodles aside from the free medical and dental services conducted that day. On January 23, 2015, Manalo inaugurated the livelihood and housing project.

On November 9, 2015, Manalo inaugurated a community project for Kabihug tribe, an indigenous group in Camarines Norte. The project is situated in a 100-hectare land which includes 300 housing units, calamansi orchard, ecological farm, dried fish factory, garments factory, clinic, learning center, and an INC worship building. After 6 months, another housing and eco-farming community project was inaugurated by the church on May 27, 2016, for the B'laan tribe in Bgy. Danlag, Tampakan South, South Cotabato in southern Philippines.

Administration and organization

Iglesia ni Cristo has had three Executive Ministers who lead the Church Administration in overseeing the faith of the members. Eduardo V. Manalo, as the current Executive Minister, serves as the church's leader, and, in this capacity, manages the administration of the church. Along with other senior ministers which comprises the Church Economic Council, the Executive Minister forms the Central Administration of Iglesia ni Cristo.

The Central Office in Quezon City, built in 1971, is Iglesia ni Cristo's headquarters. The Central Office is one of several structures inside the INC Central Office Complex. It houses the permanent offices of the central administration and some of the church's departments. It is here where about a thousand INC professionals and volunteers hold office. It was located in Manila during its early years, then in San Juan, and later in Makati, before moving to its present site. INC also has three main offices outside the Philippines; in Burlingame, California; Washington D.C.; and in Heathrow, London.

Administration and ministerial work are delegated into ecclesiastical districts (termed divisions until 1990) which are led by District Ministers (formerly, division ministers). Ecclesiastical districts comprise 40 congregations (referred to as locales) on average. All locales were directly managed by Felix Y. Manalo until 1924 when the first ecclesiastical district was organized in Pampanga.

Architecture

Iglesia ni Cristo church buildings primarily serve as places of worship and are used for other religious functions. These are described by Culture and Customs of the Philippines, a book published by Greenwood Publishing Group, as structures "which employ exterior neo-Gothic vertical support columns with tall narrow windows between, interlocking trapezoids, and rosette motifs, as well as tower and spires." There are multiple entrances leading to the main sanctuary, where males and females sit on either side of the aisle facing a dais where sermons are made. The choir loft is located behind the dais, and in larger churches, a baptistry with pools for immersion baptism is located at the back of the church. Meanwhile, Fernando Nakpil-Zialcita, an anthropologist from Ateneo de Manila University, said that INC churches can be uniquely identified for "its exuberant use of fanciful forms and ornaments [and a] brilliant white facade whose silhouette is a cusped Gothic arch or a flattened Saracenic arch." The distinctive spires represent "the reaching out of the faithful to God." Prominent architects, such as Juan Nakpil (a National Artist of the Philippines for architecture) and Carlos A. Santos-Viola, had been involved in designing INC churches while the Engineering and Construction Department of INC, established in 1971, oversees the uniformity in design of church buildings.

The first chapel was built on Gabriela Street in Tondo, Manila in 1918, fashioned out of sawali (woven leaf panels), nipa and wood, typified the style and materials of the early chapels. After World War II, INC began to build concrete chapels, the first of these in Washington (Maceda), Sampaloc, Manila completed in 1948. Next came the chapel and former official residence of the executive minister in San Juan, Rizal (now San Juan City, part of Metropolitan Manila), designed by Juan Nakpil. The Central Temple, which opened on July 27, 1984, can accommodate up to 7,000 persons, and was designed by Carlos A. Santos-Viola. It features octagonal spires, "fine latticework" and ribbed windows. Recent buildings are variations on the designs of the Central Temple. These are designed to accommodate 250 to 1,000 persons while larger churches in Metro Manila and provincial capitals can accommodate up to 3,000 persons.

INC churches outside the Philippines which were acquired from different religions undergo intensive renovations to meet the standard of INC worship services.

Political influence in the Philippines

The Iglesia ni Cristo is close to fundamentalist style and supports conservative politicians. It is known for its practice of bloc voting during elections. During the 2016 presidential election, INC communities in Agusan del Sur, Nueva Ecija, Rizal, Dasmariñas, and Quezon City delivered 98% to 100% of the total votes to the endorsed candidates. The church supported the candidacies of Benigno "Noynoy" Aquino III, and Rodrigo Duterte during the 2010, and 2016 presidential elections respectively.

On June 12, 2009, former President Gloria Macapagal Arroyo signed Republic Act 9645, declaring July 27 as "Iglesia ni Cristo Day", a special national working holiday. On February 13, 2018, President Duterte appointed INC's executive minister, Eduardo Manalo, as special envoy for overseas Filipino concerns.

Controversies

Iglesia ni Cristo Billion Loans  
Despite the strict instructions of the previous leaders of the church namely Brothers Felix Y. Manalo and Erano G. Manalo against church-initiated loans and against pawning of church properties, the Iglesia ni Cristo in 2014 under the administration of Eduardo Manalo obtained billions of loans from two Philippine banks,   Metropolitan Bank and Trust Company and from Asia United Bank. According to loan documents, the loans were meant to partially fund the construction and completion of Philippine Arena, this despite the initial pronouncements of church leaders that the project was fully funded by INC members’ offerings. In order to secure the loans, the church mortgaged its properties located in Metro Manila, Cavite, Nueva Ecija and Baguio. The church also used 317 residential units of its LIG Condominium, a housing for church ministers and church workers that is based beside the church headquarters in Barangay Central, Quezon City as part of the loan collaterals.

Leadership controversy 
During mid 2015, internal conflicts challenged the century-old church. Felix Nathaniel "Angel" Manalo, the brother of current executive minister, Eduardo V. Manalo, as well as their mother, Cristina "Tenny" Manalo, the widow of former executive minister Eraño G. Manalo, uploaded a video to YouTube alleging that the INC administration had threatened their lives and that there has been a mass kidnapping of ministers. The INC, however, denied the claims of kidnapping. On July 23, 2015, Eduardo expelled his two brothers, one of three sisters, and mother, for allegedly trying to create a schism in the church and take over the church's leadership.

Former INC ministerial worker Lowell Menorca II stated that his life and that of his family were threatened by the INC administration, leading the Canadian government to grant him asylum: "When the panel considers the links between the INC and the law enforcement authorities in the Philippines…[t]he panel is satisfied Menorca would be unable to avail himself of state protection, from the risks that he fears in that country." The Immigration and Refugee Board has found that the Philippines-based church "is motivated by a vendetta" and has "both the means and the motivation to seriously harm or kill" him, should he return to the Philippines.

In response to these issues, the Church Administration launched the program “Tunay Na Defenders Of The Faith” (The True Defenders Of The Faith) on March 31, 2018, on YouTube and Facebook, dismissing allegations made by the expelled.

Suppression of critics 
Rovic Gloria Canono was arrested in November 2016 over a case allegedly filed under the direction of  INC leaders and INC Legal Department. Canono was allegedly behind the critical Facebook page "Sher Lock” and blog "Silent No More" which accuses corruption within the church's ranks. Canono fled the Philippines after being charged with various cases by church members, including a libel case by the church's top leader Eduardo V. Manalo. Canono arrived and applied for asylum in Canada in December 2016. In a hearing in February 2017, his claim was accepted by the Immigration and Refugee Board on the basis of religious persecution as mandated by the United Nations Convention on Refugees of 1951. Like Menorca, Canono is now a resident of Canada. Rotary Philippines now gives an award named after Canono, known as "The Rovic Canono Human Rights Award", in honor of Canono's work as an advocate of human rights.

Death of Lito Fruto 

Another figure in the 2015 church crisis was a U.S. citizen living in the Philippines. American Lito Fruto was expelled from the INC in the early part of 2015 because of his critical statements against the church leadership, which had been rocked by corruption scandals and allegations of abductions supposedly perpetrated by top INC officials. He was initially under the witness protection program by the Philippine government in April 2015, as he claimed to have received threats due to his allegations against the INC leadership. In November 2015, he filed a complaint against members of the INC's top administrative body, the Sanggunian, accusing them of coercion, harassment, threats, and arbitrary detention. Fruto said that he had been forcibly taken at gunpoint from his Caloocan residence based on a complaint of alleged rape against him, which he said was fabricated by INC. Fruto believed that they were held by the INC against their will because of their supposed exposes against the church. He also said the judge in the rape case, who also issued Fruto a hold departure order, was a member of the INC.

Fruto was shot several times by an unidentified gunman as he was driving along Cavitex Exit in Barangay Marulas, Kawit, Cavite, around 1:30 am on May 24, 2017. Several excommunicated INC members allege that the killing may have been perpetrated by church officials, whom Fruto has publicly spoken out against.

Abductions and murders
A few days after Danilo Patungan was abducted, Felix Villocino disappeared as well. Villocino had long been delivering food supplies to the Manalo residence in Tandang Sora, Quezon City. Several former members of the church believed that these disappearances were a repeat of the suspected abductions, allegedly committed by the church against its own ministers in 2015 when the feud between the current INC leader Eduardo V. Manalo and his siblings Angel V. Manalo and Lottie Manalo-Hemedez became public knowledge.
Villocino was expelled after he openly supported Angel Manalo by delivering food supplies for the besieged Manalo siblings. Villocino's bullet-riddled body was found the following day in a grassy portion of Barangay Malamig, Bustos, Bulacan.

The Fifth Estate coverage 
On November 11, 2018, the Canadian Broadcasting Corporation's The Fifth Estate, hosted by Bob McKeown, featured INC on an episode entitled "The Church of Secrets," which followed the story of a widow of a murder victim allegedly killed by INC members after a series of verbal altercations, as well as the story of excommunicated ministerial worker Lowell Menorca II, who sought refugee status in Canada. The news crew also attempted to land an interview with Eduardo V. Manalo after an event in Sacramento but were denied. During their attempt to land the interview, their vehicle's tires were slashed, which McKeown suspected was an act of intimidation by INC. An INC member denied the allegation. In February 2019, the CBC and The Fifth Estate were sued by INC for defamation, with officials calling the show "slanderous" and "without evidence". CBC News responded by stating they stand behind the story.

Reception from other religions 
Karl Keating, the founder of Catholic Answers, said in 1990 that the INC engages in anti-Catholicism and anti-Protestantism in its God's Message magazine. Keating views the church as being built on a set of anti-Catholic doctrines, and that their lessons, as well as their God's Message magazine are dedicated more to debunking Catholic and Protestant beliefs and doctrines than to explaining their own positions.

Let Us Reason Ministries, an online apologetics research group, has challenged the Iglesia ni Cristo's doctrines that one can only receive salvation if they are a member of the INC, and for saying that the INC has the sole authority from God to interpret and preach the Bible, while other religions do not. They also say that the Iglesia ni Cristo fallaciously misinterprets Biblical passages in order to suit their doctrines.

James White, of Alpha and Omega Ministries, challenged the theology of the Iglesia ni Cristo in a public debate. White and Jose Ventilacion of the Iglesia ni Cristo met for a debate on April 21, 2017, in Rapid City, South Dakota.

A book-length Catholic treatment of INC history and teachings is: Elesterio, Fernando, The Iglesia Ni Kristo: Its Christology and Ecclesiology, Quezon City, Philippines: Cardinal Bea Studies, Cardinal Bea Institute, Loyola School of Theology, Ateneo de Manila University, 1976.

See also
 Christian Era Broadcasting Service International
 Eagle Broadcasting Corporation
 DZEM - INC Radio DZEM 954
 DZCE-TV - INC TV
 DZEC-TV - Net 25

Notes

References

External links

 

 
Christian denominations founded in the Philippines
Christian organizations established in 1914